Roboastra is a genus of sea slugs, polycerid nudibranchs, marine gastropod molluscs in the family Polyceridae. They are carnivorous, feeding on other species of nudibranch.

Species 
Species in the genus Roboastra include:

 Roboastra arika Burn, 1967
 Roboastra gracilis (Bergh, 1877) 
 Roboastra rubropapulosa (Bergh, 1905) 
 Roboastra tentaculata (Pola, Cervera & Gosliner, 2005)

Species transferred to other genera:
 Roboastra caboverdensis Pola, Cervera & Gosliner, 2003 synonym of Tyrannodoris caboverdensis (Pola, Cervera & Gosliner, 2003)
 Roboastra ernsti Pola, Padula, Gosliner & Cervera, 2014 synonym of Tyrannodoris ernsti (Pola, Padula, Gosliner & Cervera, 2014)
 Roboastra europaea García-Gómez, 1985 synonym of Tyrannodoris europaea (García-Gómez, 1985)
 Roboastra gratiosa (Bergh, 1890) synonym of Tambja gratiosa
 Roboastra leonis Pola, Cervera & Gosliner, 2005 synonym of Tyrannodoris leonis (Pola, Cervera & Gosliner, 2005)
 Roboastra luteolineata (Baba, 1936) synonym of Tyrannodoris luteolineata (Baba, 1936)
 Roboastra nikolasi Pola, Padula, Gosliner & Cervera, 2014 synonym of Tyrannodoris nikolasi (Pola, Padula, Gosliner & Cervera, 2014)
 Roboastra ricei Pola, Cervera & Gosliner, 2008 synonym of Tyrannodoris ricei (Pola, Cervera & Gosliner, 2008)
 Roboastra tigris Farmer, 1978 synonym of Tyrannodoris tigris (Farmer, 1978)

References

Polyceridae